Teniente a guerra (roughly translated into English as "War lieutenant") was a title used in times of the Spanish colonial Empire to describe a position exercising duties similar to those exercised by a town or city mayor today (2019).  A teniente a guerra was a position that combined the duties of mayor, military lieutenant and justice of the peace.

Description
The position was a combination of military commandant and civil superintendent that the Spanish Crown, via its colonial governors in each of its oversees provinces, such as Puerto Rico and Santo Domingo, planted in each district to oversee a region of the governed territory. The position of teniente a guerra was established in Ponce in the 1680s. The United States judiciary has called this position a "royal alcalde".

Powers, obligations and alternates
People holding this position were authorized and empowered to perform the following duties: provide for public safety, levy contributions, collect taxes, carry out orders and circulars of the governor, and administer justice. When the teniente a guerra was not available (sickness, travel, incapacity or death) they were substituted by a sargento mayor.  The sargento mayor was the leader of an urban militia in town. The urban militia the sargento mayor led was in charge of patrolling and guarding the urban areas, capturing criminals, delivery of official documents, transportation and movement of prisoners, opening and maintenance of trails, town policing, and the protection and defense of the perimeter to avoid contraband.

See also
 Corregidor
 Alcalde
 Alcalde ordinario
 Sargento mayor
 Corregidor
 Cabildo (council)
 Regidor
 Síndico
 Ayuntamiento
 Corregimiento
 Santa Hermandad
 Alcalde de la Santa Hermandad

References

Further reading
 Fay Fowlie de Flores. Ponce, Perla del Sur: Una Bibliográfica Anotada. Second Edition. 1997. Ponce, Puerto Rico: Universidad de Puerto Rico en Ponce. p. 196. Item 1003. 
 "Cuadro sinoptico de las autoridades locales de Ponce, 1692 - 1972." Boletín de la Academia de Artes y Ciencias de Puerto Rico. Volumen 8 (Octubre-Diciembre 1972.) pp. 379–384. (CUTPO).

Military ranks
Military history of Spain
Spanish colonial governors and administrators
Early Modern history of Spain
14th-century establishments in Spain
1833 disestablishments
Positions of subnational authority